Specialty Publications is an American publisher of gay erotic material.

Specialty Publications was owned by LPI Media until LPI's publishing holdings were purchased in August 2008 by Regent Entertainment. Writers included Mickey Skee, J.C. Adams, Billy Masters, Leo Buck and Jeremy Spencer, among others.

Magazines 

 Men
 Freshmen
 Unzipped

References

External links

Gay male pornography